Avramovo is a village in Yakoruda Municipality, in Blagoevgrad Province, in southwestern Bulgaria. Its railway station is the highest point of the Septemvri–Dobrinishte narrow-gauge line, and in the Balkan Peninsula.

Gallery

References

Villages in Blagoevgrad Province